Hu Qianxun (born 18 September 1987) is a Chinese amateur boxer. He competed in the light welterweight division at the 2016 Summer Olympics, but was eliminated in the second bout.

References

External links

 
 
 
 
 

1987 births
Living people
Chinese male boxers
Olympic boxers of China
Boxers at the 2016 Summer Olympics
Sportspeople from Wenzhou
People from Wenzhou
People from Zhejiang
Sportspeople from Zhejiang
Light-welterweight boxers
21st-century Chinese people